Tuesday was a punk and emo band formed by three ex-members of Chicago ska punk band Slapstick after the latter's breakup in 1996. The band's initial line-up consisted of Dan Andriano (bass/vocals), Matt Stamps (guitar), and Rob Kellenberger (drums/vocals). They released a demo on 1133 in 1996, before releasing an EP, titled Early Summer, on Asian Man Records in 1997. Later that same year, they released their first and only album, Freewheelin. While recording this album in California, the members of Tuesday also served as the backing band for Mike Park for the first album by The Chinkees, The Chinkees Are Coming. Also during this time, Rob and Matt were in college, and Dan found himself with extra free time. He started playing with other bands on the side including an instrumental band called Dulcet Tone, and eventually Alkaline Trio, after their original bass player Rob Doran departed. In early 1998, Tyler Wiseman from Dulcet Tone joined as a second guitarist for Tuesday to help expand the band's sound and tour in support of Freewheelin. They toured the U.S. in spring and the summer of 1998. They continued to write songs throughout this period intended for a follow-up album. With other members of the band devoting more time to family and college, and Dan enjoying success with the Alkaline Trio, Tuesday faded away as an active band sometime in 1999. 

Kellenberger went on to play drums with Duvall, Colossal, and briefly for the reunited Smoking Popes. Wiseman went on to play with The Honor System and Whale|Horse.

Discography

Studio albums

EPs

Compilations
 Mailorder is Fun, Asian Man Records (1997) - song: "Goodbyes Have Been Said"
 Mailorder is Still Fun, Asian Man Records (1999) - song: "So Awake"
 Mailorder For the Masses, Asian Man Records (2000) - song: "Another Disco Party"
 Living Tomorrow Today: A Benefit for Ty Cambra, Asian Man Records (2001) - song: "Everybody Was in Love"

References

Pop punk groups from Illinois
Asian Man Records artists

Punk rock groups from Illinois
Musical groups established in 1996
1996 establishments in Illinois
Musical groups disestablished in 1999
Musical groups from Chicago
Emo musical groups from Illinois